Równia may refer to:

 Równia, Lesser Poland Voivodeship, a village
 Równia, Podkarpackie Voivodeship, a village
 Równia pod Śnieżką, a subalpine plateau